Morgan DeBaun (born 1990) is an African American serial entrepreneur and corporate advisor. She is the Founder and CEO of Blavity Inc., the leading digital media company for Black culture and millennials.

Early life and education
DeBaun was born in St. Louis, Missouri. While living in a predominantly white suburban neighborhood, her family surrounded her with positive black role models. They sent her to a magnet school in the city so she could be around more children like herself.

DeBaun showed an interest in business at an early age. She sold sugary snacks to her fellow students in their middle school that lacked vending machines, and she learned about investing from her father at age 14.

She came up with the idea of Blavity Inc. while attending Washington University in St. Louis. Black students there would sit together at lunch and talk for hours. She referred to this gathering of African-American students as Black Gravity, or Blavity.

Career
DeBaun began her career working on product management and business development at Intuit. She kept her full time job at Intuit but was spending all her nights and weekends working on Blavity. She ultimately left Intuit and committed to Blavity full time due to her dissatisfaction with the media coverage of Michael Brown's death.

DeBaun cofounded Blavity with Aaron Samuels and Jeff Nelson in 2014. They started with a curated video newsletter and built a website, which was only the beginning. The site features content created by and for young black Americans, including subjects such as the Black Lives Matter movement and protests of the National Anthem.

The news site has grown into a digital ecosystem with a monthly reach of over 100 million people and over 100 corporate partners per year. Their portfolio of brands includes Blavity News, AfroTech, Travel Noire, Shadow and Act, 21Ninety and Lunchtable. Their conferences include Summit21 for Black women creators and AfroTech, the largest tech conference connecting a global community of 20,000+ Black tech innovators through a series of digital and in-person events.

Blavity Inc. recently launched Blavity.org, a 501(c)(3) nonprofit with the mission to drive Black economic advancement forward through entrepreneurial fellowship programs featuring grants, education & mentorship.

DeBaun is one of few African-American female founders that have raised more than $1 million in venture capital, in fact, DeBaun has raised $12 Million for Blavity, Inc.

DeBaun also acts as an advisor to influential global brands and companies including Disney, American Airlines, CES, and Pantora Bridal and often partners Blavity with big brands to help them authentically reach Black audiences.
 
DeBaun is also the creator of WorkSmart, a business podcast and small business advising program and founder of M Roze Essentials and Growth Notebook. DeBaun also advises entrepreneurs and start up founders in her WorkSmart Program.

Awards and recognition
2016 – Forbes 30 Under 30 list of "young people transforming the future of media"

2016 – The Root 100 list of the 100 most influential African Americans

2016 – MVMT50 Top 10 Innovators of the Year

2018 – Forbes' America's Top 50 Women In Tech.

2019 - Culture Creators Innovators & Leaders Technology Award 

2020 - Dot.LA Rising Entrepreneur

References

External links

Blavity web site
WorkSmart Program

1990 births
African-American company founders
American company founders
American women chief executives
American technology chief executives
Businesspeople from St. Louis
Living people
Washington University in St. Louis alumni